Joutsijärvi is a medium-sized lake in the Kokemäenjoki main catchment area. It is located in the region Satakunta in Finland.

See also
List of lakes in Finland

References

Lakes of Ulvila